Robert Buffum (July 7, 1828 to July 20, 1871) was an American soldier who fought in the American Civil War. Buffum was the third person to receive the country's highest award for bravery during combat, the Medal of Honor, for his action during the Great Locomotive Chase in Georgia (U.S. state) in April 1862. He was honored with the award on 25 March 1863.

Biography

Buffum was born on July 7, 1828 in Salem, Massachusetts and enlisted into the 21st Ohio Infantry at Gilead, Ohio on September 2, 1861. He was among a group of Ohio men (19 soldiers and 2 civilians) who volunteered to participate in a secret mission to disrupt Confederate communication. In April the group, led by James J. Andrews, which later came to be called Andrews' Raiders, boarded a train in Georgia. On April 12, after the train had stopped in Big Shanty, they commandeered the train's engine and three boxcars and headed towards Chattanooga, Tennessee. Under pursuit from the Confederates, they destroyed track and telegraph lines along the way. They never made it to Chattanooga but abandoned the engine. They were all captured within a week. Some of the men were hanged. Buffum was taken as a prisoner of war, but was eventually exchanged on 17 March 1863.

Buffum died on July 20, 1871. His remains are interred in Auburn, New York.

Medal of Honor citation

See also

Great Locomotive Chase
List of Andrews Raiders
List of American Civil War Medal of Honor recipients: A–F

References

1828 births
1871 deaths
People of New York (state) in the American Civil War
Union Army soldiers
United States Army Medal of Honor recipients
American Civil War recipients of the Medal of Honor
Great Locomotive Chase